Pullet Surprise is a 1997 7-minute Looney Tunes short released in theaters with Cats Don't Dance. It was produced by Chuck Jones Film Productions. Since this cartoon was produced after the death of legendary Looney Tunes voice artist Mel Blanc on July 10, 1989, the voice of Foghorn Leghorn is supplied by Frank Gorshin, while Stan Freberg reprises his role as Pete Puma from the 1952 short, Rabbit's Kin. The term "pullet" in the title refers to a young female chicken, while the title is a pun on "Pulitzer Prize". The short was not included in the DVD release of Cats Don't Dance, though it was included as a bonus feature on the DVD release of The Looney Looney Looney Bugs Bunny Movie.

Plot 
In the cartoon, Pete Puma is trying to raid the henhouse Foghorn Leghorn is guarding; Foghorn decides to have some fun with Pete. He tells Pete what he really wants is a Venezuelan Racing Chicken which has unfortunately run back to Venezuela. Pete runs there and back in time. Next, he really wants an Irish Wrestling Chicken, which turns out to be a rope tied to a bull's tail (this bull resembles Toro from Bully for Bugs). When Pete makes off with a chicken, nest and all, Foghorn grabs the chicken, then says Pete's found the rare Mongolian Disappearing Chicken, and the only way to make it reappear is tap dancing; Pete dances into a hole; Foggy drops an anvil on Pete's head ("a whole lotta lumps!"). Foggy walks away, chuckling at his cleverness, when a genuine Irish Wrestling Chicken pins him down ("I'm glad I say I'm glad I didn't show him the Norwegian Exploding Chicken").

During the cartoon, Foghorn tries to convince Pete to go hunting for rabbits to which Pete quickly and frantically declines ("uh-uh! No rabbits!"). This is most likely referencing Pete's previous run in with Bugs Bunny during the cartoon Rabbit's Kin.

References

External links 

 
 Pullet Surprise on Voice Chasers.

Looney Tunes shorts

1997 short films
1990s American animated films
Films directed by Darrell Van Citters
1997 animated films
1997 films
Foghorn Leghorn films
Films about cougars
Warner Bros. Animation animated short films
1990s Warner Bros. animated short films
1990s English-language films